Finescale standards or Fine Standards are model railway standards that aim to be close to the prototype dimensions.  Reduction in toylike, overscale flanges, pointwork, etc.  In Britain it is particularly used because small British prototypes meant that track gauge is underscale.  Modelling to finescale standards requires skill, so modellers usually start with the coarse standards applied to ready-to-run models suitable as toys.  Standards are set by modellers' societies.

Finescale model railway standards
 ScaleSeven (7 mm scale, O gauge)
 EM gauge (4 mm scale, 18.2 mm gauge)
 P4 (4 mm scale, 18.83 mm gauge)
 Proto:48 (1/4 inch scale)
 Proto:87 (H0 scale)
 3 mm finescale
 2 mm finescale
 O14 (7 mm scale, 14 mm gauge - to represent 2 ft narrow gauge)

References

Model railroad scales